SV Schaffhausen is a Swiss football club based in Schaffhausen, in the north of the country. It was founded in 1922. The club colors are black and white. The club nickname is "Spielvi." The club operates a total of twenty teams, including 4 men's teams and 16 junior teams. They are known to be more active within local football than their bigger local rivals FC Schaffhausen. They currently play in the Swiss 1. Liga, the third tier of Swiss football.

History
The club was formed in 1922 by the merger of two clubs, Hollow Tree and Sportclub Schaffhausen. Between 1949 and 1951 the club were trained by Albert Sing who went on to great success as coach of BSC Young Boys.

The club played for many years in the lower echelons of Swiss football until 1990, when the club made it into the 2nd tier, the Challenge League.

Stadium
Schaffhausen play their home games at Sportplatz Bühl, a small multi-purpose stadium with a capacity of 1,000.

References

External links
 Official website 
 Soccerway profile 
 football.ch profile 

Schaffhausen
Association football clubs established in 1922
Schaffhausen
1922 establishments in Switzerland